Poliosia umbra is a moth in the family Erebidae. It was described by Walter Rothschild in 1915. It is found in New Guinea, where it is only known from the surroundings of the Utakwa River.

References

Moths described in 1915
Lithosiina